Thap Phut is a district (amphoe) in Phang Nga province in the south of Thailand.

History
In 1785 Burmese troops attacked Mueang Thalang. The inhabitants escaped from Thalang to the area of modern-day Thap Put. They built shelters that in the southern Thai language are called thap. The shelters were covered by tree leaves which are called put.

The district was established in 1897 as one of the original districts of Phang Nga Province.

Geography
Neighboring districts are (from the west clockwise): Mueang Phang Nga of Phang Nga; Phanom of Surat Thani province; and Plai Phraya and Ao Luek of Krabi province. To the south is Phang Nga Bay.

Administration 
The district is divided into six sub-districts (tambons), which are further subdivided into 38 villages (mubans). Thap Phut itself has township (thesaban tambon) status. There are five tambon administrative organizations (TAO).

External links
amphoe.com

Thap Phut